Bato, officially the Municipality of Bato (Rinconada Bikol: Banwāan ka Bato; Tagalog: Bayan ng Bato), is a 3rd class municipality in the province of Camarines Sur, Philippines. According to the 2020 census, it has a population of 52,155 people.

The municipality of Bato, like Buhi town, is home to a lake teeming with various kinds of fishes. Sinarapan, the world's smallest commercially harvested fish, occupies the waters of Lake Bato. Also present, the lake abounds with tilapia housed in fish cages.

History

This town was formerly called as "Kaliligno" or "Caliligno" named by the natives that settled along the river area. 

This small village later was elevated into a status of a town under the decree of Spanish Superior Government on February 15, 1753. Years back, a parish was already existing which was also made under the same decree. This parish adopted "The Most Holy Trinity" as its patron saint. Its feast day is celebrated every Sunday after the Pentecost. The Bato is also known for its best noodles called Pansit Bato.

Geography

Barangays

Bato is politically subdivided into 33 barangays.

Climate

Demographics

Only about 58.27% of the household population is considered as literate.

Mother tongue of the majority is Riŋkonāda also known as Bikol Rinconada, one of the languages of Bicol region. The population speaks a different form of Rinconada Bikol called Bato variant, a lowland dialect (sinaranəw). Natives are also conversant with Coastal Bikol, Filipino/Tagalog and English languages.

Religion

 Roman Catholicism is the predominant religion, followed by the Iglesia ni Cristo as the largest minority.
 Other religious denominations include Church of Jesus Christ of Latter Day Saints; United Churches of Christ in the Philippines Seventh Day Adventist; Bible Baptist; Born Again; Jehovah's Witnesses; Protestants; Aglipay and Islam.

Economy 

Majority of employment is within agriculture, fishery, poultry and construction industry groups.

Commerce and industry
 96 commercial establishments engaged in retail trade
 46 commercial establishments engaged in services
 1 commercial establishment engaged in real estate - MTBK Co. 
 1 engaged in banking and finance
 31 industrial establishments
 2 Hotels - Casa de Piedra and MTBK Hotel
Natural resources include clams, pearls, local shrimps, tabios, and tilapia, particularly within Lake Bato; forest products such as anahaw leaves and local bamboo; non-metallic mineral resources such as white clay among others.

Agriculture Sector
 78.087 square kilometers of Agricultural Lands devoted to crop production
 Rice, corn, coconut, root crops, vegetables, and fruit-bearing trees.
 Numerous farm and poultry products found

Local government 
The list of the incumbent and former officials of the Municipality of Bato is the following:

2022 - Present:
 Mayor: Domingo L. Zorilla Jr
 Vice-Mayor: Victorio S. Ramos   
Councilors:
 Josebello Buquid 
 Martin G. Batacan
 Noel C. Tino
 Alvin O. Sacueza
 Adolfo F. Ramos  Jr.
 Noel C. Tuyay
 Erwin Nestor O. Rempola

2019-2022:
 Mayor: Hon. Francisco B. Bernaldez
 Vice-Mayor: Hon. Domingo L. Zorilla Jr.  
Councilors:
 Diosdado T. Zorilla 
 Dominici G. Batacan 
 Elizabeth Doctolero
 Ignacio L. Hugo
 Jose Samar
 Ban-Ban Aguila
 Matilde Sandrino
 Noel C. Tino

2016-2019:
 Mayor: Hon. Francisco B. Bernaldez
 Vice-Mayor: Hon. Victorio S. Ramos
Councilors:
 Diosdado T. Zorila
 Domingo L. Zorilla Jr.
 Martin G. Batacan
 Darwin Doctolero
 Edgar R. Argarin
 Nestor A. Orasa
 Danilo S. Mata
 Ignacio L.Hugo

List of former Municipal Mayors 

 Paulino Calleja (1860)

Tourism

 Cotmon Falls
 Arbin Beach Resort 
 Lake Bato
 Most Holy Trinity Parish Church

Infrastructure

Health
 Municipal Health Center and Barangay Health Stations total bed capacity: Eight (8) beds
 Health personnel numbers only about seventeen (17)

Security

Facilities for police protection include Police Station Headquarters near the Municipal Hall in the Poblacion, Police Substation in Barangay Tres Reyes, Police Outpost in Barangay San Miguel. The bureau of Fire Protection of Bato has about eleven (11) firemen personnel.

Transportation
  of National Roads
  of Provincial Road
  of municipal roads
  of Barangays Roads
 six (6) bridges
 235 privately owned vehicles
 public utility vehicles and government vehicles

Utilities
Water supply is provided on 3 levels:
 Level I: wells, springs, or water peddlers common in rural barangays and households
 Level II: communal faucet system
 Level III: Bato Water District provides Level III Water Supply Service generally within the poblacion only

Power and electricity:
 Camarines Sur Electric Cooperative (CASURECO) which provides retails electrical supply to the municipality and maintains a substation
 Domestic Consumptions
 95.18% with total average consumption rate of 35,595.40 KWH/month Industrial and Commercial Consumption have only about 0.48% connections
 Public buildings, streetlights and other account for the remaining 1.72% number of consumption

Communication facilities include telephone/cellular services, postal services, telegraph services, cable television services, and print and broadcast media services.

Education

Private school institutions:
 Holy Trinity College of Cam. Sur
 Mataas na Paaralan ng Pagatpatan
 Saint John the Baptist Institute of Bicol Inc.
 Ocampo Academy Technological Institute. 
 Taburnal Learning Center
 Modern Learning Center
 Verbum Dei School 

15 public elementary schools:

Bato North Central School
Bato South Central School
San Vicente Elementary School
San Miguel Elementary School
Agos Elementary School
Nino Jesus Elementary School
Masoli Elementary School
San Roque Elementary School
Atipolo Elementary School
Carlos Nardo Elementary School
Manga Elementary School
Palo Elementary School
Buluang Elementary School
Salvacion Elementary School
Cristo Rey Elementary School
Sagrada Elementary School
Dr. Heracleo Guballo Elementary School 
Tagpolo Elementary School 

5 public secondary schools:
Bato National Highschool
Masoli Highscool
Salvacion National Highschool
San Roque National Highschool
Payak Highschool 

1 public library:
MTBK Divina Pastora Library

Notable personalities

 Maria Venus Raj - Binibining Pilipinas-Universe 2010 and placed 4th Runner-Up in Miss Universe 2010 pageant

References

External links

 [ Philippine Standard Geographic Code]
Philippine Census Information
Official Site of the Province of Camarines Sur
https://ph.rappler.com/elections/2022/camarines-sur/bato

Municipalities of Camarines Sur